3-Deoxy-2-octulosonidase (2-keto-3-deoxyoctonate hydrolase, octulosylono hydrolase, octulofuranosylono hydrolase, octulopyranosylonohydrolase) is an enzyme with systematic name capsular-polysaccharide 3-deoxy-D-manno-2-octulosonohydrolase. This enzyme catalyses the following chemical reaction

 Endohydrolysis of the beta-ketopyranosidic linkages of 3-deoxy-D-manno-2-octulosonate in capsular polysaccharides

The bacteriophage enzyme depolymerizes polysaccharides containing 3-deoxy-2-octulosonide in the cell wall of Escherichia coli.

References

External links 
 

EC 3.2.1